Vicia biennis is a species of flowering plant belonging to the family Fabaceae.

Its native range is Hungary to Western Siberia and Caucasus.

References

biennis